Glenn Charles Andrew Alexander (Parker) is a Canadian hypnotist who has toured North America, Europe and Asia and currently maintains a second home in Beijing, China. He is also an author,  clinical hypnotherapist, and corporate trainer. As a clinical hypnotherapist and corporate trainer, he works with clients with complete confidentiality on a variety of issues, including; stress management, memory improvement, study skill improvement, goal setting, overcoming phobias, and most commonly smoking cessation.

Professional Life & Hypnosis Career
After attending the University of British Columbia, to study English and psychology, Alexander became a Certified Master Trainer of Hypnosis and a Certified Master Trainer of NLP (Neuro-Linguistic Programing) through the Canadian Institute of Ethical Hypnosis.

Under the stage name Dr. Chaos, Alexander began touring Canada and the United States, where he founded "The World’s First Dual Hypnosis Team". With his apprentice joining him onstage, Dr. Chaos and Damien Noir began touring. In October 2003, Alexander and team went to Asia for originally one year of touring with their comedy hypnosis show. This led to the team remaining in Asia and bringing their unique entertainment and training to China. Since its inception the "Dr. Chaos and Damien Noir" stage show has seen 3 different apprentices taking the stage alongside Alexander as part of "The World's First Dual Hypnosis Team". In 2006, Alexander was invited by Tsinghua University in Beijing to be their Training Expert and Supervisor of Clinical Hypnosis and NLP. Alexander continues to offer personal hypnosis training and certification, as well as regularly speaking at universities, colleges and corporations, writing, consulting for a variety of companies, as well entertaining on stage.

Books
While living in Beijing, Alexander accepted an invitation from the Foreign Languages Press to author a Beijing city guidebook. He co-authored the English language guidebook "Streetwise Guide Beijing". It was originally published in 2007, and a special Olympics edition was printed in 2008.

Subsequently, Alexander accepted an invitation from the People's Publishing House, China's oldest publishing house, and has currently authored two Chinese-language books. The first of his Chinese-language publications, Decoding Deception (不要对我说谎), uses elements of hypnosis and psychology to give readers a greater understanding of and an ability to recognize lies. Alexander's second Chinese-language publication, Exam Mastery – A Total Approach (考前冲刺－知识向左，心理向右), uses psychology and hypnosis alongside standard pedagogical precepts to help students identify their learner type and how to use their predispositions for acquiring knowledge to create a comprehensive study plan. This book is specifically geared for high school students, preparing to write the GaoKao examination. Alexander is currently working on his next book while consulting on two in-development movie projects as their hypnosis expert.

Media Appearances
Alexander has done extensive interviews and appearances in both radio and television. In addition to numerous television shows, he has been featured in magazine and newspaper articles in print and online. He appeared on A Date With Lu Yu for two complete one-hour episodes to a viewing audience of over 15 million people, as well as SZTV's The Generation Show. He was featured in an article of "Trends Health" magazine, additionally  City Weekend featured him on the cover of an issue, as well as publishing articles in print and online about Alexander and his comedy hypnosis shows. He has also been written about in China Daily

References

Canadian hypnotists
Year of birth missing (living people)
Living people